KN-23 is a designation given to a North Korean solid-fueled tactical ballistic missile.

Design

Initial variant 
The KN-23 bears an external resemblance to the Russian Iskander-M and South Korean Hyunmoo-2B SRBMs, being distinguished by its elongated cable raceway, different jet vane actuators and smooth base. Like the Iskander-M, it flies in a quasi-ballistic trajectory, flattening out below an altitude of about  where the atmosphere is dense enough so the missile's fins can change course along its flight path. It is believed to have a range of some 450 km with a 500 kg warhead, putting all of South Korea within range, though it is possible to extend range out to 690 km with a reduced payload; warhead can be conventional, likely unitary or submunition, or nuclear. The KN-23's active steering capability could make it accurate to within 100 meters CEP with satellite guidance, or within 200 meters using INS alone. It is launched from a wheeled transporter-erector-launcher (TEL).

Nonetheless, the KN-23 is significantly larger than the Iskander, with it using likely the same 1.1 meter diameter motor as the Pukkuksong-1. The motor is somewhat lengthened, although having only one stage, compared to the Pukkuksong-1. The motor has a very different structure, compared to the Iskander. The TEL of the KN-23 has more space for the missile, as it lacks the  structure immediately after the cab.

The KN-23 is likely to replace older liquid-fueled North Korean SRBMs like the Hwasong-5 and Hwasong-6. Being road-mobile and solid-fueled, it can be moved and fired more rapidly, making it more difficult for an opposing force to locate and target before firing. Once launched, the missile's low apogee, short overall flight time, and ability to conduct a terminal "pull-up" maneuver makes it harder to detect and be intercepted by traditional missile defense systems. Its increased accuracy also reduces the number of missiles that would be needed to destroy a single target.

The KN-23 is likely to feature some form of foreign involvement such as parts, as when compared to the later developed KN-24, the Korean Central News Agency focuses mainly on the deployment of the missile, with little coverage on its research. While the KN-24 are called 'Juche projectiles', it is never mentioned for the KN-23. The focus on the combat-readiness of the system also suggests that it had been deployed for a while but not tested, like the Hwasong-10. Nonetheless, the KN-23 still bears significant differences from the 9K720 Iskander.

KN-23 warhead section has enough space for up to 1500 kilograms of high explosives compared to 700 kilograms for SCUD-B and 800 kilograms of 9K720 Iskander.

Larger variant 
In the 14 January 2021 parade, a larger version was seen, with an estimated length of 9.8 metres and likely an extra segment in the motor. This version is also fitted to a longer TEL, with an additional two sections. The nose cone is similar in shape to the KN-24.

SLBM variant 
On 19 October 2021, a KN-23-type missile was launched from a submerged Sinpo-class submarine as a submarine-launched ballistic missile (SLBM). The missile reportedly traveled  and reached an altitude of 60 km. In order to launch underwater, it was fitted with a gas generator to cold launch out of the submarine's missile tube into the air before the main motor ignites. Compared to previous North Korean SLBMs like the Pukkuksong-1 and its larger derivatives, the type retains the KN-23's depressed trajectory and manoeuvring flight characteristics to try to evade missile defences. However, since it is based on a missile with a shorter range than the Pukkuksong-series, the submarine would need to get closer to its target in order to launch, leaving it more vulnerable to detection and destruction before it can fire. The development of the KN-23 as an SLBM may be more of a political statement than an effort to create a viable weapon, as the test occurred weeks after South Korea tested their own Hyunmoo 4-4 SLBM, both of which are derived from the same Iskander design base. On May 7th 2022, another suspected KN-23 type SLBM was test-fired. The missile flew 600 km and attained a apogee of 60 km.

On 25 September 2022, a KN-23 was launched from an underwater silo located under an inland reservoir. Photos showed it launching out of an inland body of water, similar to previous submarine launches. It is likely the missile was fired from a submersible barge containing launch silos, and it is unknown whether such a system will be pursued as a serious launch method or if it was a demonstration of another capability to deter South Korean preemption strategies by adding another potential deployment method.

Smaller variant 
On 16 April 2022, a new SRBM version was tested. It appeared to be a smaller iteration of the KN-23, fired from a wheeled vehicle mounting four rectangular launch canisters. The missile has similar range compared to the KN-02, and could be a counterpart to the South Korean KTSSM. The launches were accompanied with a statement associating them with the development of tactical nuclear weapons. If equipped with smaller and lighter tactical nuclear warheads and retaining the KN-23's maneuverability, the missiles could have better survivability against missile defenses to greater threaten short-range targets.

History
North Korea first displayed the KN-23 publicly in a military parade on 8 February 2018. By 17 May, United States Forces Korea had formally designated the weapon as the KN-23. A fourth flight test on 6 August 2019 launched two missiles from the country's west coast, overflying the North Korean capital region at an apogee of 37 km out to 450 km.

North Korea stated the test of two road-mobile KN-23s on 27 January 2022 was to confirm the power of an air burst conventional warhead. The launch was on a depressed trajectory of 20 km apogee (previously 37-60 km) while traveling , showing the missile can fly at a lower altitude over short ranges, which would reduce reaction time for missile defenses. Taken together, this suggests that the KN-23 is operational.

Larger variant 
Two of the larger missiles, a variant of the KN-23 that are longer with a more conical nose, were first launched on 25 March 2021. North Korea claimed the new version flew  and is equipped with a  warhead, although South Korean and Japanese analysis initially said they only flew 420-450 km while reaching an altitude of 60 km, and such a large warhead weight is almost certainly exaggerated; it's possible that such a large payload claim could be propaganda intended to give the impression that North Korea is keeping pace with their adversary's missile advancements, as the South Korean Hyunmoo-4 has a  warhead and the larger KN-23 version was proclaimed to have "the world's largest warhead weight." However, the next month South Korean Defence Minister Suh Wook revealed they had revised their estimate and agreed with the North Korean statement of a 600 km range, saying the discrepancy resulted from blind spots in radar coverage due to the Earth’s curvature. The new weapon would be able to almost completely cover South Korea from its launch site. If it can perform as claimed by North Korea, the weapon would be a powerful bunker buster weapon. UN Security Council members states suspect the claim of a mass of 2.5 tons may refer to the entire weight of the missile after burnout rather than just the warhead weight.

Rail launched missile 
On 15 September 2021, two missiles were fired from Yangdok that traveled  to a maximum altitude of 60 km. They appeared to be baseline KN-23 versions, however they flew much further than any previous flight of the weapon and went an even greater distance than the larger variant tested earlier in the year. Such excess range could indicate it hadn't previously been tested out to its maximum range or that the design underwent modifications such as a reduced payload or flight profile improvements. Interestingly, the launches were made from a modified railway car rather than the typical road-mobile launcher. The launch railcar used two side-by-side erector/launcher mechanisms like the side-by-side arrangement used in the TEL. The use of a rail-mobile system is unusual for an SRBM, as road-mobile launchers are easier for deploying and hiding relatively small missiles while railway missiles are restricted to the rail network. Adding railway launchers may be an effort to further increase and diversify the country's SRBM missile force, since modifying existing railcars to fire missiles could be a way to supplement a limited number of launch trucks, or possibly to test the concept before applying it to intercontinental ballistic missiles (ICBMs); a rail-borne ICBM would have advantages over one carried by a wheeled TEL, as such large liquid-fueled missiles carried in railway cars would be able to move more places and be kept in a higher readiness state.

On 14 January 2022, North Korea again tested railway launched KN-23. Two missiles fired from Uiju and traveled . On 15 January, KCNA released photos of the missile launching test.

See also
9K720 Iskander
Hyunmoo-2
KN-24

References

External links
KN-23. Military-Today

Tactical ballistic missiles
Ballistic missiles of North Korea
Tactical ballistic missiles of North Korea